Psychopsidae is a family of winged insects of the order Neuroptera. They are commonly called silky lacewings.

The silky lacewings are distinguishable in their adult stage by their spectacularly patterned and pubescent wings, broad wing shape, dense venation, and the presence of a vena triplica (the apical fusion of three veins in the hindwing).

Taxonomy
They were formerly placed in the superfamily Hemerobioidea, but do not seem to be closely related to these net-winged insects at all. Rather, might be closer to the Myrmeleontoidea which contain for example the antlions (Myrmeleontidae). In particular, the spoon-winged laceflies (Nemopteridae) seem to be very closely related to the silky lacewings. These had at one time been placed in a superfamily Nemopteroidea. The fossil family Osmylopsychopidae was - as indicated by their scientific name - initially believed to be intermediate between the Psychopsidae and the Osmylidae. But actually these similarities are due to plesiomorphies in the first case, and simply misperceived in the second; the osmylopsychopids are one of the basal lineages of the Myrmeleontoidea as traditionally defined. The Nemopteroidea were eventually abolished and its members included in the Myrmeleontoidea. But as the silky and spoon-winged lacewings together with the "butterfly" lacewings of the Kalligrammatidae do seem to form a quite distinct clade among the expanded Myrmeleontoidea, it appears well warranted to reinstate the Nemopteroidea for them.

Silky lacewings were especially more diverse from the Triassic period to the Tertiary than in modern times.

Genera and species
The family currently includes five living genera in two subfamilies; there are also a number of extinct genera with uncertain relationships. The extant species are restricted to the Afrotropical (three genera), Indomalayan (one genus) and Australasian (one genus) regions:

Subfamily Psychopsinae
Genus Balmes (Southwestern and Southern Asia)
Balmes birmanus (McLachlan, 1891) 
Balmes chikuni Wang & Bao, 2006  
Balmes formosus (Kuwayama, 1927)  
Balmes notabilis Navás, 1912  
Balmes terissinus Navás, 1910 

Subfamily Psychopsinae (continued)
Genus Psychopsis Newman, 1842 (Australia)
Psychopsis barnardi Tillyard, 1925
Psychopsis coelivaga (Walker, 1853)
Psychopsis dumigani Tillyard, 1922
Psychopsis elegans (Guérin-Méneville, 1844)
Psychopsis gallardi (Tillyard, 1919)
Psychopsis gracilis Tillyard, 1919
Psychopsis illidgei Froggatt, 1903
Psychopsis insolens McLachlan, 1863
Psychopsis maculipennis Tillyard, 1925
Psychopsis margarita Tillyard, 1922
Psychopsis meyricki McLachlan, 1887
Psychopsis mimica Newman, 1842
Psychopsis tillyardi New, 1989

Subfamily Zygophlebiinae
Genus Cabralis Navás, 1912 (central to southern Africa)
Cabralis gloriosus Navás, 1912
Genus Silveira Navás, 1912 (Afrotropical)
Silveira jordani Kimmins, 1939
Silveira marshalli (McLachlan, 1902)
Silveira occultus Tjeder, 1960
Silveira rufus Tjeder, 1960
Genus Zygophlebius Navás, 1910 (central and southern Africa)
Zygophlebius leoninus Navás, 1910
Zygophlebius pseudosilveira Oswald, 1994
Zygophlebius zebra (Brauer, 1889)

incertae sedis genera
The following extinct genera are based on Peng et al. 2011:
Genus †Ainigmapsychops Makarkin & Archibald, 2014
 †Ainigmapsychops inexspectatus Makarkin & Archibald, 2014 Klondike Mountain Formation, Eocene (Ypresian); Washington State, USA)
Genus †Angaropsychops 
†Angaropsychops sinicus (?Early Cretaceous; Liaoning, China)
†Angaropsychops turgensis (Turga Early Cretaceous, Transbaikalia, Russia)
Genus †Apeirophlebia
†Apeirophlebia grandis Green Series, Early Jurassic (Toarcian); Dobbertin, Germany
Genus †Archepsychops
†Archepsychops triassicus (Carnian; Queensland, Australia)
Genus †Arctopsychops
†Arctopsychops zherikhini Late Cretaceous (Turonian); NE Siberia, Russia
Genus †Baisopsychops
†Baisopsychops lambkini Early Cretaceous, Zaza Formation: Transbaikalia, Russia)
Genus †Beipiaopsychops
†Beipiaopsychops triangulatus Haifanggou Formation, Middle Jurassic, Liaoning, China)
Genus †Calopsychops
†Calopsychops extinctus Karabastau Formation, Late Jurassic (Oxfordian/Kimmeridgian); Karatau, Kazakhstan
Genus †Cretapsychops
†Cretapsychops decipiens Daohugou, Middle Jurassic China,
†Cretapsychops corami Weald Clay, Early Cretaceous (Barremian), Wealden, UK
Genus †Embaneura 
†Embaneura vachrameevi Late Cretaceous (Cenomanian); Emba, Kazakhstan)
Genus †Epipsychopsis
†Epipsychopsis fusca Zaza Formation, Russia
†Epipsychopsis variegata Zaza Formation, Russia
Genus †Grammapsychops 
†Grammapsychops lebedevi (Cenomanian; Siberia, Russia)
Genus †Kagapsychops
†Kagapsychops aranea Kuwajima Formation, Early Cretaceous Japan)
†Kagapsychops continentalis Late Cretaceous (Turonian); Kzyl-Zhar, Kazakhstan
Genus †Litopsychopsis
†Litopsychopsis burmitica Burmese amber, Myanmar, mid-Cretaceous (Albian-Cenomanian)
Genus †Micropsychops
†Micropsychops parallelus Weald Clay, United Kingdom
Genus †Miopsychopsis
†Miopsychopsis relicta (Late Eocene/Early Oligocene; Sikhote-Alin, Russia)
†Miopsychopsis sikhotensis (Late Eocene/Early Oligocene; Sikhote-Alin, Russia)
Genus †Propsychops
†Propsychops karatavicus Karabastau Formation, Kazakhstan
Genus †Propsychopsis Baltic amber, Eocene 
†Propsychopsis helmi 
†Propsychopsis hageni 
†Propsychopsis lapicidae
Genus †Psychopsites 
†Psychopsites rolandi (Weald Clay, United Kingdom
Genus †Pulchroptilonia
†Pulchroptilonia espatifata Crato Formation, Brazil, Early Cretaceous (Aptian)
Genus †Putzneura
†Putzneura parcimoniosa Crato Formation, Brazil
 Genus †Sinopsychops
†Sinopsychops chengdeensis Jiulongshan Formation, Middle Jurassic; Hebei, China)
Genus †Triassopsychops 
†Triassopsychops superbus Blackstone Formation, Australia, Late Triassic (Norian)
Genus †Undulopsychopsis Peng, Makarkin, Wang, & Ren, 2011
†Undulopsychopsis alexi (Yixian Formation, Aptian; Liaoning, China)
Genus †Valdipsychops Weald Clay, United Kingdom, Early Cretaceous
†Valdipsychops minimus 
†Valdipsychops brigidae
†Valdipsychops logunovi 
†Valdipsychops proudlovei
†Valdipsychops maculosus

References

<anic.ento.csiro.au/insectfamilies/biota_details.aspx?OrderID=25378&BiotaID=42887&PageID=families>
  (2007): The neuropterid fauna of Dominican and Mexican amber (Neuropterida, Megaloptera, Neuroptera). American Museum Novitates 3587: 1-58. PDF fulltext

Myrmeleontiformia
Taxa named by Anton Handlirsch
Neuroptera families